

The BUAA Mifeng-6 (en:Bee-6) is a hot-air airship designed and built in China by the Beijing University of Aeronautics and Astronautics. The Mifeng-6 first flew on 20 December 1985 and at least four have been built. The Rotax 447 piston engine not only provides propulsion but is also used to inflate the envelope, burners are used to provide heat for buoyancy variation.

Specification

References

Notes

Bibliography

Airships
Balloons (aeronautics)
Airships of China